The Vijf Meihal is a complex located in the Dutch city of Leiden. It has been used as a sports arena since 1968. In 2006 it became the home of Zorg en Zekerheid Leiden, a Dutch professional basketball team. Until 2010 the Vijf Meihal had a capacity of 700 people. This was expanded to 2,000 people in 2010.  The expansion cost somewhere around 500,000 euros and did allow Zorg en Zekerheid Leiden to play in European competitions.

The Dutch national basketball team played a EuroBasket qualification match in the Vijf Meihal on 16 August 2013. The Netherlands played against Portugal and won the match, 71–53. Later the Vijf Meihal became the main arena of the national team.

The complex is nicknamed De Schuur (English: The Barn) by ZZ Leiden fans.

References

Basketball venues in the Netherlands
Indoor arenas in the Netherlands
Buildings and structures in Leiden
Sport in Leiden